East Fortune is a village in East Lothian, Scotland, located 2 miles (3 km) north west of East Linton.  The area is known for its airfield which was constructed in 1915 to help protect Britain from attack by German Zeppelin airships during the First World War.  The RNAS airship station also included an airship hangar.  In 1919 the British airship R34 made the first airship crossing of the Atlantic, flying from East Fortune to Mineola, New York.

The name may mean "settlement where hogs are farmed", from Old English fōr, a hog, and tūn, a settlement. In 1922 several buildings and an area of land were used to create East Fortune Hospital.  This served as a tuberculosis sanatorium for the south east region of Scotland until the onset of World War II.  The airfield was then brought back into service as RAF East Fortune, initially a training airfield, and the hospital patients were transferred to Bangour Hospital in West Lothian. The hospital re-opened after the war, but by 1956, as the number of tuberculosis patients began to fall, the hospital changed its function to house the mentally handicapped.  In 1997, the hospital closed down, and its patients were transferred to Roodlands Hospital in Haddington.

For a short period in 1961, East Fortune operated as Edinburgh's airport while facilities at Turnhouse were being reconstructed.

In 1975, the National Museum of Flight was opened at the airfield, and has since become a popular tourist attraction.  It is also home to a Concorde, G-BOAA from the decommissioned British Airways fleet, which forms the centrepiece of a major exhibition about the Concorde programme.

At the eastern side of the airfield the old runways and link roads of East Fortune airfield are now used as a motorcycle race track run by the Melville Motorcycle Club.  There are around seven race weekends every year with racing on both Saturdays and Sundays, continually attracting over 200 competitors over the several classes available.  Riders travel from the local area, Northumberland and as far as Ireland on occasions for most weekends.  Melville Motorcycle Club run the track on a not-for-profit basis and have reinvested heavily in resurfacing and upgrading facilities. From 2014, the track also hosts a Greenpower race.

At the western side of the airfield East of Scotland Microlights operate from the extension to the main runway that was laid in 1961 when the airfield was used as Edinburgh's Airport.

An annual airshow is held, normally in July, however no aircraft are able to land during the airshow due to the runways being in an unfit state for aircraft operations.

See also
East Fortune railway station

Sources

External links

Notes on East Fortune Hospital - The Fourth Statistical Account of East Lothian
Railbrit - East Fortune

Villages in East Lothian